Jan Lipšanský (born 27 September 1968, in Brno) is a Czech journalist, screenplay writer, writer and stage director.

He studied at Film and TV School of the Academy of Performing Arts in Prague, screenplaywriting and dramaturgy. He is active in advertisement (Mark/BBDO, JWT, Mother Tongue etc.), as journalist he was in various known Czech newspapers and magazines (Večerník Praha, Kino, PC World, DiViDi, Katolický týdeník, Tiscali, Filmpub, Christnet and others). He worked as a public relations editor in Czech Television (1995–1997).

He wrote some screenplays for Czech Television and for some amateur movie makers. He is also active in radio broadcasting Czech Radio, Radio Vaticana. He was the president of Ecumenical Jury at Karlovy Vary International Film Festival 2002.

His stories you can find in Mysli si svět (Kruh Hradec Králové, 1990), Jak Češi jednají (Milenium Publishing Chomutov 2000), Fantasy 1992 /2002 (Avari/Klub Julese Vernea 2003), České srdce pro Jana Pavla II. (Karmelitánské nakladatelství 2005), Brněnská diecéze (1777–2007), Historie a vzpomínky (Brněnské biskupství 2006), sborník literární soutěže Řehečská slepice 2007.

His first novel, The Death of Fallen Brother (Smrt odpadlého bratra) was published by Fatym, 2005, and reprinted by Akcent, Třebíč in 2009. He also wrote historic drama about Czech king Wenceslas II. Deník Václava II.

In 2011, he directed stage play Smíšené dvouhry (Mixed Doubles)

He is also author of comics ZOO Stories (Příběhy ze ZOO) for famous Czech magazine Čtyřlístek.

Some of his Prague stories (with various other authors) you can find in the book Prague Mysteries, published in 2015.

Bibliography 
2005: SMRT ODPADLÉHO BRATRA, 
2008: NA OBRANU KATOLÍKŮ, 
2008: MRTVÍ MOHOU TANCOVAT, 
2009: TŘI MINIPŘÍPADY JACKA LINNÉHO, 
2009: DENÍK VÁCLAVA II., 
2009: SMRT ODPADLÉHO BRATRA / JEDINÝ DEN TÉ ZIMY PADAL SNÍH, 
2009: ČESKÝ FILM 1990 – 2007, 
2010: DITA MĚLA SVÁTEK / NAPOLEON ZE ŠLAPANIC, 
2011: MRTVÁ Z LETIŠTĚ, 
2012: KDO ZABIL ELVISE PRESLEYHO?, 
2013: BRIANOVA CESTA,  (see: http://www.bezvydavatele.cz/book.php?Id=342)
2014: PRAŽSKÁ NOKTURNA, 
2014: OFICIÁLNÍ TISKOVÁ ZPRÁVA Z ORBITÁLNÍ STANICE, 
2015: PRAŽSKÁ NOKTURNA, 
2015: BRIANOVA CESTA, 
2015: OFICIÁLNÍ TISKOVÁ ZPRÁVA Z ORBITÁLNÍ STANICE,

References 

Info on Spisovatele.cz
Review od Smrt odpadlého bratra on Detektivky.com
Review od Tři minipřípady Jacka Linného on Detektivky.com

External links

1968 births
Living people
Writers from Brno
Czech journalists
Czech screenwriters
Male screenwriters